Harper's Encyclopædia of United States History was published by Harper & Brothers in 1901 and 1905, and again later in 1915.  Notably, it contains a preface, titled The Significance of American History, written by future president Woodrow Wilson, PhD, LL.D., then president of Princeton University.  There are ten volumes in the set.

External links
Full text of Harper's Encyclopedia of United States History, courtesy of the Perseus Project

Encyclopedias of history
History books about the United States
Reference works in the public domain
Harper & Brothers books
1901 non-fiction books
American encyclopedias